Blackdown or Black Down may refer to:

Places

Australia

 Blackdown, Queensland, a locality in the Central Highlands Region
Blackdown Tableland National Park in Queensland.

Canada

Blackdown Cadet Training Centre, a Canadian Cadet training centre (Tri-Force) located at CFB Borden, Ontario.

England

 Blackdown, Dorset, a village near Chard
 Black Down, Dorset, a hill near Portesham
 Blackdown, Hampshire, a village near Winchester
 Black Down, Somerset, a hill in the Mendip Hills
 Blackdown, Warwickshire, a village near Leamington Spa
 Blackdown, West Sussex, a hill also spelt Black Down
 Blackdown Hill, Dorset, one of Dorset's highest points
 Blackdown Hills, a range of hills in Somerset and Devon
 Princess Royal Barracks, Deepcut (Blackdown Camp), a World War II army camp near Aldershot, Hampshire

Computing 
 Blackdown Java, a port of Sun's Java virtual machine to Linux.

Popular culture 
 "Blackdown", a song by Patrick Wolf from The Bachelor
 "Blackdown", a song by French artist Laurent Voulzy from Lys & Love